Unthank is a village in the civil parish of Skelton, in Cumbria, England. In 1870-72 the township had a population of 39 as recorded in the Imperial Gazetteer of England and Wales.

See also

Listed buildings in Skelton, Cumbria

References

External links
 Cumbria County History Trust: Skelton (nb: provisional research only – see Talk page)

Villages in Cumbria
Skelton, Cumbria
Inglewood Forest